George Gallop (1590–1650) was an English politician who sat in the House of Commons  at various times between 1625 and 1650. He supported the Parliamentary cause in the English Civil War.

Gallop was the son of Thomas Gallop, of Strode, Dorset and his wife, Agnes Watkins, daughter of Humphrey Watkins of Holwel, Somerset.  

He became a merchant of Southampton and in July 1619 acquired the property of Southampton Castle. He became an alderman of the city.

In 1625, Gallop was elected Member of Parliament for Southampton. He was re-elected MP for Southampton in 1626 and 1628 and sat until 1629 when King Charles decided to rule without parliament for eleven years.  In 1632 he was mayor of Southampton.

In November 1640, Gallop was re-elected MP for Southampton in the Long Parliament. He supported the parliamentary cause and survived Pride's Purge to sit in the Rump Parliament
Gallop died in 1650. He left a charitable donation to provide clothing for poor people.

References

 

1590 births
1650 deaths
Roundheads
Members of the Parliament of England for Southampton
17th-century English merchants
People from West Dorset District
English MPs 1625
English MPs 1626
English MPs 1628–1629
English MPs 1640–1648
English MPs 1648–1653
Mayors of Southampton